Calcifer is a ghost town in the locality of Chillagoe in the Shire of Mareeba, Queensland, Australia.

Geography 
It is near Calcifer Creek.

History 
The town's name was derived from a combination of the words calx, cuprum and ferrum, the Latin words for "limestone", "copper", and "iron" respectively. The town was established in 1894, when John Moffat established a copper smelter on the site. At its height in 1898, the town boasted stores, a branch of the Bank of Australasia, a cricket team, and five hotels. An accident at the nearby Hobson mine in 1903 killed three men; and by 1907 smelting operations had moved to Chillagoe, and the site was all but deserted. Today, all that remains are the foundations of the smelters and a small cemetery with five graves.

References

External links 

Ghost towns in Queensland
Shire of Mareeba
Populated places established in 1894
1894 establishments in Australia